Astathes costipennis is a species of beetle in the family Cerambycidae. It was described by Fisher in 1935. It is known from Borneo.

References

C
Beetles described in 1935